Ponnaranjanam is a 1990 Indian Malayalam-language film, directed by Babu Narayanan and produced by Hameed. The film stars Jahnvi, Usha, Mahesh, Innocent and Adoor Bhavani. The film's score was composed by Kozhikode Yesudas. Lesbian is the main theme of the film. The film received a dubbed version in Hindi as Galat Sambandh. There also exists a rare uncut/uncensored version of the film

Cast
Jahnvi/Devishri as Rosy Chakko
Usha as Padinjare Manakkal Savithri/Ponnu
Usha Thenginthodiyil as Shantha Nedungadi
Bhuvana Saravana
Mahesh as Vinu
K. B. Ganesh Kumar as Gilbert
Innocent as Thirumeni/Savithri's father
Adoor Bhavani
Baiju Santhosh as Mathappan
Mala Aravindan as Ayyappan
Mamukkoya as Ummukoya
Kanakalatha as Ayyapan's Wife

Soundtrack
The music was composed by Kozhikode Yesudas with lyrics by R. K. Damodaran.

References

External links
 

1990 films
1990s Malayalam-language films
Films directed by Babu Narayanan